Peroff is a surname. Notable people with the surname include:

Justin Peroff (born 1977), Canadian musician
Nicholas Peroff (born 1944), American political scientist and academic

See also
Perloff
Persoff